Susi may refer to:

933 Susi, a minor planet orbiting the Sun
Susi Air, an Indonesian airline
Sydney University Stellar Interferometer, an optical interferometer in Sydney, Australia

People

Given name
Susi Erdmann (born 1968), German luger and bobsledder
Susi Ganeshan, Indian film director
Susi Giebisch (born 1930), Austrian figure skater
Susi Graf (born 1959), Austrian-American film director
Susi Handschmann (born 1959), Austrian ice dancer
Susi Jeans (1911–1993), Austrian organist
Susi Kentikian (Susianna Kentikian; born 1987), Armenian boxer
Susi Kilgore, American illustrator
Susi Lanner (1911–2006), Austrian film actress
Susi Nicoletti (1918–2005), Austrian film actress
Susi Pudjiastuti, 6th Minister of Maritime Affairs and Fisheries of Indonesia, CEO Susi Air
Susi Susanti (born 1971), Indonesian badminton player
Susi Wirz (Suzanne Wirz; born 1931), Swiss figure skater
Susi (biblical figure), scout mentioned in the Bible
Susi, loyal servant of explorer David Livingstone, along with Chuma

Surname
Arnold Susi (1896–1968), Estonian politician and lawyer
Carol Ann Susi (1956-2014), American actress
Dunia Susi (born 1987), English football player
Heli Susi (1929–2020), Estonian teacher and translator
Timo Susi (born 1959), Finnish ice hockey player

See also
al-Susi (disambiguation); also as-Susi
Sushi (disambiguation)
Susie (disambiguation)
Susy (disambiguation)
Suzi (disambiguation)
Suzie (disambiguation)
Suzy (disambiguation)

Estonian-language surnames
Finnish-language surnames